Year 1527 (MDXXVII) was a common year starting on Tuesday (link will display the full calendar) of the Julian calendar.

Events 
 January–June 
January 1 – Croatian nobles elect Ferdinand I of Austria as King of Croatia in the Parliament on Cetin.
 January 5 – Felix Manz, co-founder of the Swiss Anabaptists, is drowned in the Limmat in Zürich by the Zürich Reformed state church.
 March 17 – Battle of Khanwa: Babur defeats Rajput ruler Rana Sanga. This and two other major Moghul victories lead to their domination of northern India. Dhaulpur fort is taken by Babur.
 March 
 Paracelsus is appointed as city physician of Basel, Switzerland.
 The Confederation of Shan States sack Ava, the capital of the Ava Kingdom.
 April 30 – The Treaty of Westminster (1527), an alliance during the War of the League of Cognac, is signed.
 May 6 – Sack of Rome: Spanish and German troops led by the Duke of Bourbon sack Rome, forcing Pope Clement VII to make peace with Charles V, Holy Roman Emperor, marking the end of the High Renaissance. The Pope grows a beard in mourning.
 May 16 – In Florence, the Piagnon, a group devoted to the memory of Girolamo Savonarola, drive out the Medici for a second time, re-establishing the Republic of Florence until 1530.
 June 17 – The Narváez expedition to conquer Florida sets sail from Spain.
 June 17 – The Protestant Reformation begins in Sweden. The Riksdag of the Estates in Västerås adopts Lutheranism as the state religion, in place of Roman Catholicism. This results in the confiscation of church property and dissolution of Catholic convents in accordance with the Reduction of Gustav I of Sweden. 
 June 22 – Jakarta, current capital of Indonesia, is founded as Jayakarta.
 June 23 – Paracelsus burns the books of Avicenna.

 July–December 
 August 3 – The first known letter is sent from North America by John Rut, while at St. John's, Newfoundland.
 August 20 – Sixty Anabaptists meet at the Martyrs' Synod in Augsburg.
 August 20 – Diet of Odense (Denmark): King Frederick I declares religious tolerance for Lutherans, permits marriage of priests and forbids seeking papal pallium (approval) for royal appointments of Church officials.Fisher, George P (1873). The Reformation. Scribner.
 September 27 – Battle of Tarcal: Ferdinand, future Holy Roman Emperor, defeats John Zápolya and takes over most of Hungary. John appeals to the Ottomans for help.

Date unknown 
 The Spanish conquest of Guatemala's highlands is completed; the first city in Guatemala, Ciudad Vieja is founded.
 Members of the University of Wittenberg flee to Jena, in fear of the bubonic plague.
 Bishop Vesey's Grammar School (at Sutton Coldfield, in the West Midlands of England) is founded by Bishop John Vesey.
 Sir George Monoux College is founded as a grammar school at Walthamstow, England, by Sir George Monoux, draper and Lord Mayor of London.
 The Ming dynasty government of China greatly reduces the quotas for taking grain, severely diminishing the state's capacity to relieve famines through a previously successful granary system.
 The second of the Dalecarlian rebellions breaks out in Sweden.

Births 

 March 4 – Ludwig Lavater, Swiss Reformed theologian (d. 1586)
 March 5 – Ulrich, Duke of Mecklenburg (d. 1603)
 March 10 – Alfonso d'Este, Lord of Montecchio, Italian nobleman (d. 1587)
 March 21 – Hermann Finck, German composer and music theorist (d. 1558)
 March 28 – Isabella Markham, English courtier (d. 1579)
 March 31 – Edward Fitton, the elder, Irish politician (d. 1579)
 April 14 – Abraham Ortelius, Flemish cartographer and geographer (d. 1598)
  May 1 – Johannes Stadius, German astronomer, astrologer, mathematician (d. 1579)
 May 21 – Philip II, King of Spain (d. 1598)
 May 31 – Agnes of Hesse, German noble, by marriage, Princess of Saxony (d. 1555)
 June 11 – Anna Sophia of Prussia, Duchess of Prussia and Duchess of Mecklenburg (d. 1591)
 June 24 – Jean Vendeville, French law professor, Roman Catholic bishop (d. 1592)
 July 8 – Saitō Yoshitatsu, Japanese daimyō (d. 1561)
 July 13 – John Dee, English mathematician, astronomer, and geographer (d. 1608)
 July 31 – Maximilian II, Holy Roman Emperor (d. 1576)
 August 10 – Barbara of Brandenburg, Duchess of Brieg, German princess (d. 1595)
 September 29 – John Lesley, Scottish bishop (d. 1596)
 October 2 – William Drury, English politician (d. 1579)
 October 15 – Maria Manuela, Princess of Portugal (d. 1545)
 October 21 – Louis I, Cardinal of Guise, French Catholic cardinal (d. 1578)
 November 1 
 Pedro de Ribadeneira, Spanish hagiologist (d. 1611)
 William Brooke, 10th Baron Cobham, English noble and politician (d. 1597)
 November 3 – Tilemann Heshusius, Gnesio-Lutheran theologian (d. 1588)
 November 18 – Luca Cambiasi, Italian painter (d. 1585)
 December 6 – Bernhard VIII, Count of Lippe (d. 1563)
 December 23 – Hugues Doneau, French lawyer (d. 1591)
 date unknown
 Giuseppe Arcimboldo, Italian artist (d. 1593)
 Luis de León, Spanish lyric poet and mystic (d. 1591)
 Sakuma Nobumori, Japanese retainer and samurai (d. 1581)
 Annibale Padovano, Italian composer and organist (d. 1575)
 probable
 John Dudley, 2nd Earl of Warwick, English nobleman (d. 1554)
 Lawrence Humphrey, English clergyman and educator (d. 1590)

Deaths 

 January 5 – Felix Manz, leader of the Swiss Anabaptists (executed) (b. 1498)
 January 21 – Juan de Grijalva, Spanish conqueror (b. 1489)
 March 14 – Shwenankyawshin, Burmese king of Ava (b. 1476)
 March 17 – Rana Sanga, Indian ruler (b. 1484)
 April 19 
 Christoph I, Margrave of Baden-Baden (b. 1453)
 Henry Percy, 5th Earl of Northumberland (b. 1477)
 April/May – Sir Thomas Docwra, English Grand Prior of the Knights Hospitaller (b. 1458)
 May 6 – Charles III, Duke of Bourbon, Count of Montpensier and Dauphin of Auvergne (b. 1490)
 June 21 – Niccolò Machiavelli, Italian writer and statesman (b. 1469)
 June 28 – Bernardo de' Rossi, Italian bishop (b. 1468)
 July 28 – Rodrigo de Bastidas, Spanish conqueror and explorer (b. c. 1460)
 September 21 – Casimir, Margrave of Brandenburg-Bayreuth, Margrave of Bayreuth (b. 1481)
 October 27 – Johann Froben, Swiss printer and publisher (b. c. 1460)
 November 15 – Catherine of York, English princess (b. 1479)
 November 8 – Jerome Emser, German theologian (b. 1477)
 date unknown – Luisa de Medrano, Spanish scholar  (b. 1484)
Francesco Colonna, Italian Dominican priest (b. 1433)
 Div Sultan Rumlu, Persian military leader
 Petrus Thaborita, Frisian historian and monk (b. c. 1450)
 Cristoforo Solari, Italian sculptor and architect (b. c. 1460)
 Jan "Ciężki" Tarnowski, Polish nobleman (b. c. 1479)
 Huayna Capac, Sapa Inca of the Inca Empire (b. 1493)
 Ludovico Vicentino degli Arrighi, Italian calligrapher and type designer (b. 1475)
 Anna Swenonis, Swedish manuscript illuminator
 probable – Jane Shore, mistress of King Edward IV of England

References